Colin McNeil (born 5 August 1936) is  a former Australian rules footballer who played with Fitzroy in the Victorian Football League (VFL).

Notes

External links 
		

Living people
1936 births
Australian rules footballers from Victoria (Australia)
Fitzroy Football Club players